Karl Larsson (September 16, 1893 – June 1, 1967) was a Swedish-born American artist, known as an engraver, painter, and sculptor.

Biography
Karl Larsson was born in Skövde, Sweden.  He emigrated  to America in 1913.  He was a painter, sculptor, engraver, muralist, and illustrator who studied at the Art Students League  in New York City  and was a member of the American Watercolor Society. He was represented at the Gothenburg Exhibition (1923).  In 1924, he exhibited with the Society of Independent Artists in New York City. He also illustrated children's books, including those authored by his wife Marjorie Flack (1897-1958).

He later lived in Santa Fe, New Mexico where he completed a mural for the Chapel of Lady of Guadalupe Church in Jemez Springs, New Mexico. He also created silver sculptures in churches in Tucson, Fort Defiance, and Phoenix, Arizona. He died in 1967 at Dobbs Ferry, New York.

References

External links
 

1893 births
1967 deaths
American engravers
American children's book illustrators
Swedish emigrants to the United States
20th-century American painters
American male painters
20th-century American sculptors
20th-century American male artists
American male sculptors
20th-century American printmakers
People from Skövde Municipality
People from Santa Fe, New Mexico
20th-century engravers